The 1966–67 Ice hockey Bundesliga season was the ninth season of the Ice hockey Bundesliga, the top level of ice hockey in Germany. 10 teams participated in the league, and Düsseldorfer EG won the championship. FC Bayern Munchen won the DEV-Pokal.

First round

West

South

3rd place 

 EV Landshut – SC Riessersee 3:2

Relegation round

West

South

DEV-Pokal

Final round

References

External links
Season on hockeyarchives.info

Eishockey-Bundesliga seasons
German
Bund